The P107 was a World War II French half-track.

P107 may also refer to:
 , a patrol boat of the Mexican Navy
 Papyrus 107, a biblical manuscript
 Phosco P107, a lamp standard
 Retinoblastoma-like protein 1
 P107, a state regional road in Latvia